is one of the most successful professional Magic: The Gathering players and the owner of Hareruya Store in Tokyo.

Career
Saitou debuted at Pro Tour Chicago 2000. An 83rd-place finish meant he fell just short of making money. Later the same season, he made his first standout finish by reaching the top eight of the Asia Pacific Championship. His quarter-final opponent was to have been Peter Chao of Taiwan. However, Chao was not able to attend the final day of competition, and asked Saitou for a prize split. The judges ruled this to be bribery and disqualified Saitou, Chao, and Satoshi Nakamura who had acted as their interpreter.

After two seasons off tour, Saitou returned the Pro Tour in 2003–04, and to the elimination rounds at the premier level by finishing eighth at Grand Prix Nagoya. In 2005, he made his first Sunday appearance on the Pro Tour. Alongside Tomohiro Kaji, and Kenji Tsumura, he reached the top four of Pro Tour Atlanta. Saitou's team, One Spin, lost in the semifinals to the eventual champions Nova, with Saitou losing to Gabriel Nassif.

In 2006, Saitou won Pro Tour Charleston  as a member of Team Kajiharu80, along with Tomohiro Kaji and Shouta Yasooka. At the next Pro Tour, held in Kobe, Saitou made his first individual top eight appearance. He lost in the quarterfinals to Pro Tour first-timer and eventual champion Jan-Moritz Merkel. At the end of the 2006 season, Saitou was dubbed the PoY maker, because in the past two seasons his teammates, Tsumura and Yasooka, had won the Player of the year title. The following year, it would be his turn.

In 2007, Saitou made his fourth Pro Tour top eight that year, in Yokohama, losing to Kazuya Mitamura in the semifinals. He also top eighted Grand Prix Singapore, and won Grand Prix Strasbourg. At the end of the season, he won the Player of the year title, making him the first player to do so without either winning a Pro Tour or reaching the top eight of multiple Pro Tours.

The 2008 season saw Saitou finishing third at Pro Tour Berlin and making the Top 8 of three Grand Prix, but falling 20 points short of defending his title.

In 2009 Saitou won back to back Extended Grand Prix in Singapore and Kobe. The following season, he made the top eight of three more Grand Prix, winning in Columbus. At Pro Tour Amsterdam it was announced that Saitou would be inducted into the Hall of Fame. Two weeks before his induction Saitou was disqualified for stalling at Grand Prix Florence. He subsequently received an 18-month suspension from the DCI. One day before the Hall of Fame induction ceremony Wizards of the Coast announced that Saitou would not be inducted due to his suspension.

Accomplishments

 

Notes
:  Tomoharu Saitou reached the top eight of the 2001 APAC Championships as the number 1 seed after two days of competition. He was disqualified for bribery, along with Satoshi Nakamura and Peter Chao.
Other accomplishments:
 Pro Player of the Year 2007

Suspensions
In 2001 after Grand Prix Kobe, Saitou was suspended for 18 months due to consecutive disqualifications. A prize split was interpreted as being bribery resulting in a disqualification at the Asian Pacific Championships. Following that Saitou was disqualified for inappropriately attempting to get his opponent disqualified. As a result of these disqualifications, the DCI suspended Saitou for 18 months.

In 2010, Saitou was voted into the Hall of Fame. However, two weeks prior to the induction Saitou was disqualified during Grand Prix Florence leading to an 18-month suspension from the game. Wizards announced without further explanation that Saitou would not be part of the Hall of Fame based on the 2010 ballot.

References

Living people
Japanese Magic: The Gathering players
1983 births
People from Tokyo